Kimara is an administrative ward in the Ubungo district of the Dar es Salaam's central business district, east of Tanzania. According to the 2002 census, the ward has a total population of 66,288.

References

Kinondoni District
Wards of Dar es Salaam Region